Mount Lefroy is a mountain on the Continental Divide, at the border of Alberta and British Columbia in western Canada. The mountain is located on the eastern side of Abbot Pass which separates Lake Louise in Banff National Park from Lake O'Hara in Yoho National Park. Mount Victoria lies immediately on the western side of the pass.

The mountain is the site of the first fatal climbing accident in Canada. In 1896 during a failed summit bid, Philip Stanley Abbot slipped on rocks after just coming off an icy section and plummeted down the rock face to his death.

The first successful ascent was made in 1897 by J. Norman Collie, Arthur Michael, H. Dixon; Charles Fay, Peter Sarbach, R. Vanderlip, C. Noyes, Charles Thompson, and H. Parker.

A prominent painting by Canadian Group of 7 artist Lawren Harris, was painted at this site.


Geology

Mount Lefroy is composed of sedimentary rock laid down during the Cambrian period. Formed in shallow seas, this sedimentary rock was pushed east and over the top of younger rock during the Laramide orogeny.

Climate

Based on the Köppen climate classification, Mount Lefroy is located in a subarctic climate zone with cold, snowy winters, and mild summers. Winter temperatures can drop below −20 °C with wind chill factors below −30 °C.

Gallery

References

External links 

 Mount Lefroy weather: Mountain Forecast
 Parks Canada web site: Banff National Park

Mountains of Banff National Park
Three-thousanders of Alberta
Three-thousanders of British Columbia
Mountains of Yoho National Park
Canadian Rockies
Borders of Alberta
Borders of British Columbia